Darren Hill (born 3 December 1981) is a Scottish footballer who plays as a goalkeeper for  Arbroath. Hill has previously played for Falkirk, East Stirlingshire, Hamilton Academical and Linlithgow Rose, as well as two spells with Forfar Athletic.

Career
Hill has played for Falkirk, East Stirlingshire, Arbroath, Forfar Athletic and Hamilton Academical. He left Hamilton by mutual consent in December 2015. In December 2015, Hill became new Forfar manager Gary Bollan's first signing, returning to Station Park on an 18-month contract. After 6 months with Forfar, Hill signed for SJFA East Superleague side Linlithgow Rose.

References

External links

1981 births
Living people
Scottish footballers
Falkirk F.C. players
East Stirlingshire F.C. players
Arbroath F.C. players
Forfar Athletic F.C. players
Hamilton Academical F.C. players
Linlithgow Rose F.C. players
Scottish Football League players
Scottish Professional Football League players
Association football goalkeepers